Chimalpopoca is identified by some sources as a son of the Tlatoani Moctezuma II, not be confused with an earlier Aztec ruler of the same name.  According to some authors he was taken out of Tenochtitlan as a prisoner with other noble men by the Spaniards during the Noche Triste, when he was killed being struck with a bolt from a crossbow.

References

Orozco y Berra, Manuel; Historia Antigua y de la Conquista de México; Ciudad de México, 1888.  Volume IV, pp 445 and 446.
González-Obregón, Luis;  Las Calles de México;  Ciudad de México, 1992.  Page 6.

Aztec nobility

Nobility of the Americas

Moctezuma family

15th-century indigenous people of the Americas
16th-century indigenous people of the Americas
16th-century Mexican people
1480s births
1520s deaths

Year of birth uncertain
Year of death uncertain
1500s in the Aztec civilization
1510s in the Aztec civilization
1520s in the Aztec civilization